Alexandra Sellers is a writer and author of 40 contemporary romance novels and a cat language textbook considered by some to be an academic spoof. Her novels have been published in various Harlequin and Silhouette category lines, including Desire, Intrigue, Mills & Boon, Special Releases, Presents, Intimate Moments and Special Edition, as well as by Entangled and Dell. She is best known for her Sons of the Desert sheikh series.

Biography

Early life and influences
Sellers became interested in exotic locations when she was 10 and read The Arabian Nights. The book inspired her to begin writing, and she penned her first story called "Stormy", a fictionalized account of the life of her cat from the cat's perspective, soon after. Sellers believes that any writer is influenced by every writer they've read. Sellers' favourite authors include Doris Lessing, Jane Austen, Robertson Davies and  romance authors such as Jane Donnelly and Mary Burchell. Among books that have strongly influenced her are The Sufis by Idries Shah, The Thousand and One Nights translated by Richard Burton, Mansfield Park, Pride and Prejudice and Persuasion, by Jane Austen. In poetry she admires Icons of Flesh by Glen Sorestad, The Pig Poets: An Anthology of Porcine Poesy by Henry Hogge.

Education
Sellers has studied eight foreign languages, including French, German, Latin, Greek, Hebrew, Arabic, Persian, and Italian. She attended the School of Oriental and African Studies, or SOAS, a public research university located in London, United Kingdom that specializes in arts and humanities, languages, laws and social sciences relating to Asia, Africa and the Middle East. Sellers was the first student to study for a double degree in Persian and Religious Studies; she was awarded First Class Honours. She also studied Hebrew in Israel, Persian in Iran, and Arabic in Yemen.

Writing career

In her first attempt, Sellers submitted both a romantic short story and a science fiction short story to publishers. "Dear Aunt Martha" sold immediately, but the science fiction story was rejected by the first publisher who received it. Sellers took this as a sign to concentrate on the romance genre.

Her first full-length novel was published in 1980, and after this Sellers became a full-time writer. Many of her novels are set in exotic locations, some of them fictional countries. Romantic Times has described her novels as "enchanting...superbly integrating a memorable plot, delightful characters, and tender emotion."

It has been said that "There is no better illustration of the changing and evolving sensibilities of the time, in fact, than the three novels Sellers wrote for the Silhouette Intimate Moments line -- The Real Man, The Male Chauvinist, and The Old Flame....What Sellers is really writing about, however, are the socially constructed perceptions of sexuality and gender that serve to make men the enemies of women (and sometimes the reverse), and which often hide our real values, motives, and feelings even from ourselves."

Awards
In 1997, her novel A Nice Girl Like You was nominated by Romantic Times for a Reviewers' Choice Award for Best Silhouette Yours Truly. Three years later she received the Romantic Times Career Achievement Award for Series Romantic Fantasy, and in 2009 she received the Romantic Times Career Achievement Best Author Award for Series.

Linguistics
Sellers has studied the language of cats, and published her findings in the book Spoken Cat and Relevant Factors in Worldview. According to her book, "here is your milk" is "birr pirp r'mow" when translated into cat speak. "Here are a few tidbits," meanwhile, becomes "mRRah mRRah pirp r'mow."  She also believes that cats have their own body of myths and folklore. She says that the cats have told her that they came from Canopus (the second brightest star after Sirius) to educate humanity on cleanliness. In particular, they believe that we should use our excrement as fertiliser, instead of disposing of it in our drinking water.

Diana White, of The Boston Globe, described the book as "an elaborate, beautifully executed joke that not only pokes fun at the cat-human connection, but at language texts, too....Clearly, Sellers knows cats."  The SOAS Magazine stated that "Supporters of the 'pet as human companion' theory will see in the book the answer to their prayers."

Personal life
Born and raised in Canada,  Alexandra Sellers once attempted to calculate how many different places she has lived throughout her life. She gave up when she reached forty homes in twelve towns in five countries, including Canada, the UK, Israel, Spain, and Greece. But she says she hasn't visited nearly as many places as she'd like yet. She currently divides her time between London, Crete, and Vancouver.

Her favourite cat was an "extraordinarily intelligent and wonderful white cat" who was kidnapped one day by vivisectionists.  Other favourite cats include Medico, a purebred Siamese, and Monsieur, a tabby.

Bibliography: Fiction

Single novels 
 Captive of Desire (1982)
 Fire in the Wind (1982)
 Season of Storm (1983)
 The Forever Kind (1984)
 The Indifferent Heart (1984)
 The Real Man (1984)
 The Male Chauvinist (1985)
 The Old Flame (1986)
 The Best Of Friends (1990)
 The Man Next Door (1991)
 A Gentleman and a Scholar (1993)
 The Vagabond (1994)
 Roughneck (1995)
 Dearest Enemy (1995)
 A Nice Girl Like You (1996)
 Not Without a Wife! (1997)
 Shotgun Wedding (1997)
 Wife on Demand (2000)

Sons Of The Desert Series 
 Bride of the Sheikh (1997)
 Sheikh's Ransom (1999)
 The Solitary Sheikh (1999)
 Beloved Sheikh (1999)
 Sheikh's Temptation (2000)
 Sheikh's Honour (2000)
 Sheikh's Woman (2001)
 The Playboy Sheikh (2002)
 Sheikh's Castaway (2004)
 The Ice Maiden's Sheikh (2004)
 The Fierce and Tender Sheikh (2005)
 Sheikh's Betrayal (2009)

Venables Series 
 Occupation, Millionaire (1998)
 Occupation, Casanova (1999)

Sons Of The Desert: The Sultans Series 
 The Sultan's Heir (2001)
 Undercover Sultan (2001)
 Sleeping with the Sultan (2001)

Firstborn Sons Series 
 Born Royal (2001)

Johari Crown Series 
 Her Royal Protector (2014)
 The Sheikh's Love Nest (2016)

Anthologies 
 One Hundred Per Cent Male (2001) (with Peggy Moreland)
 Secret Child (2002) (with Maureen Child)
 Sheikhs of Summer (2002) (with Fiona Brand, Susan Mallery)
 Up Close and Passionate (2002) (with Maureen Child)
 Seduced by the Sheikh (2002) (with Gail Dayton)
 The Playboy Sheikh / Billionaire Bachelors: Stone (2002) (with Anne Marie Winston)
 Captured Hearts / The Greek Tycoon's Baby / Sophie's Sheikh / Spring Fling (2003) (with Kylie Brant and Lenora Worth)
 Sheikh's Desire (2003) (with Brittany Young)
 Princes of the Desert (2005) (with Kristi Gold)
 Sheikh's Castaway / The Ice Maiden's Sheikh (Omnibus) (2005)
 Desert Heat (2005) (with Susan Mallery)
 The Sheikh's Captive (2006) (with Susan Mallery)
 Desert Princes (2007) (with Lucy Gordon and Michelle Reid)
 Possessed by the Sheikh (2007) (with Susan Mallery)
 Surrender to the Sheikh (2007) (with Susan Mallery)

Bibliography: Other
Spoken Cat and Relevant Factors in Worldview (1997)

See also

 List of romantic novelists

References and sources

Living people
20th-century American novelists
21st-century American novelists
American romantic fiction writers
American women novelists
Year of birth missing (living people)
Place of birth missing (living people)
20th-century American women writers
21st-century American women writers